Sanger is a ghost town in Oliver County, North Dakota, United States. Founded in 1879, the town was originally known as Bentley. It was the county seat until 1884, when the community was renamed Sanger. Never a large community, the former town is most notable for being the birthplace of Hazel Miner, a local heroine who sacrificed her life to save her brother and sister in a 1920 blizzard. The town declined during the 20th century, and was fully abandoned by 1985.

Notes

External links
 Photos of Sanger in Winter
 Sanger on Ghosts of North Dakota
 Photos of Sanger

Geography of Oliver County, North Dakota
Ghost towns in North Dakota
Populated places established in 1879
Populated places disestablished in 1985